The 1935 Waterford Senior Hurling Championship was the 35th staging of the Waterford Senior Hurling Championship since its establishment by the Waterford County Board in 1897.

Erin's Own were the defending champions.

Erin's Own won the championship after a 4–07 to 2–04 defeat of Tallow in the final. This was their 9th championship title overall and their 9th title in succession.

References

Waterford Senior Hurling Championship
Waterford Senior Hurling Championship